Theloderma moloch is a species of frog in the family Rhacophoridae. It is found in northeastern India (Arunachal Pradesh and Assam) and adjacent Tibet, China, possibly wider. Taxonomic placement of this taxon has been a source of much debate, possibly because of wrong tissue was used for it in a molecular study—with ramifications for the taxonomy of whole Theloderma and its sister taxon Nyctixalus.

Theloderma moloch is an arboreal frog associated with tropical forest and shrubland. Breeding takes presumably place in ponds. Its habitat is threatened by wood collection.

References

moloch
Amphibians of China
Frogs of India
Fauna of Tibet
Amphibians described in 1912
Taxa named by Nelson Annandale
Taxonomy articles created by Polbot